The 1958 Nevada Wolf Pack football team represented the University of Nevada during the 1958 NCAA College Division football season. Nevada competed as a member of the Far Western Conference (FWC). The Wolf Pack were led by fourth-year head coach Gordon McEachron, who resigned after the end of the season. They played their home games at Mackay Stadium.

Schedule

References

Nevada
Nevada Wolf Pack football seasons
Nevada Wolf Pack football